Dylan Williams (born 1 July 2001) is a professional Australian rules footballer playing for the Port Adelaide Football Club in the Australian Football League (AFL).

References

External links

2001 births
Living people
Port Adelaide Football Club players
Port Adelaide Football Club players (all competitions)
Place of birth missing (living people)
Australian rules footballers from Victoria (Australia)
Oakleigh Chargers players